Lisne is an urban-type settlement in Makiivka Municipality (district) in Donetsk Oblast of eastern Ukraine. Population:

Demographics
Native language as of the Ukrainian Census of 2001:
 Ukrainian 5.81%
 Russian 94.19%

References

Urban-type settlements in Donetsk Raion